Planche may refer to:
 Planche (exercise), a bodyweight exercise
 James Planché, British dramatist, antiquary and officer of arms
 Jean Baptiste Gustave Planche (1808–1857), French art and literary critic
 La Planche, a village in France
 Planche, Haiti, a rural village in the Dame-Marie commune of Haiti